Karl Ross (15 November 1816–5 February 1858) (also known as Charles) was a German painter. He is most known for his paintings of Classical landscapes.

Biography 

Ross was born in Ruhwinkel, Holstein, then ruled by the Kingdom of Denmark. His paternal grandfather, a doctor, had moved from northern Scotland to Hamburg around 1750; his father, Colin Ross, married Juliane Auguste Remin and moved in 1810 to the Gut Altekoppel estate in Bornhöved, which he managed and later acquired. Karl Ross was the brother of Ludwig Ross, the Classical archaeologist and Ephor General of Archaeology of Greece. 

In 1832, Ross travelled to Copenhagen, where he studied at the Royal Danish Academy of Fine Arts until 1834. Among his teachers were Johan Ludwig Lund and Christoffer Wilhelm Eckersberg. He was awarded an academic prize while at the Academy, and sold several oil paintings to prince Christian Frederick, the future Christian VIII.

Ross' elder brother, Ludwig, who was then head of the Greek Archaeological Service, invited him to Greece in 1837. Throughout 1837–1839, he travelled through Greece, variously with his brother Ludwig and other central-European expatriates. He made a journey through Attica to Marathon in 1837 with Ludwig and Ernst Curtius, the future excavator of Olympia. He also stayed with Adolf von Shack near Sparta, travelling and painting, and travelled with von Shack to Ephesus, Magnesia and Smyrna.

Returning to Germany in 1839, Ross travelled to Munich in the August of that year. From November 1842 until late 1843 he lived in Rome, where he befriended the Austrian painter Carl Rahl. However, his visit was cut short by ill-health, and he returned for convalescence to his family estate at Gut Altekoppel. He studied in Paris during 1845.

During the attempted uprising against Denmark in 1848, the provisional government of Schleswig, Holstein and Lauenberg sent Ross to Berlin, with a mission of reporting news from the revolt to the Duke of Augustenborg and negotiating assistance from Frederick William IV of Prussia. He took part in meetings of the Provisional Government during April 1848, but played no further part in politics. At the end of the war, he travelled to Munich and then to Rome, after which he settled permanently in Munich from 1851.

Personal life and death 

In 1847, he married Helene Abendroth (1827–1911), whom he had met and taught during his time in Rome. She was the daughter of August Abendroth, who had supported Ross' art career, encouraged his studies abroad and bought many of his paintings.

Ross was affected by ill health throughout his life. He died of typhus on February 5, 1858, in Munich, and was buried in Bornhöved. The author Hermann Lingg wrote his obituary.

Selected works

References

Bibliography 

 
 
 
 
 
 
 

German landscape painters
1858 deaths
1816 births